The 1957 International Cross Country Championships was held in Waregem, Belgium, at the Hippodroom Waregem on 23 March 1957.   In addition, an unofficial women's championship was held one week later at Musselburgh, Scotland on 30 March 1957.  A report on the men's event as well as the women's event was given in the Glasgow Herald.

Complete results for men, and for women (unofficial), medallists, 
 and the results of British athletes were published.

Medallists

Individual Race Results

Men's (9 mi / 14.5 km)

Women's (1.9 mi / 3.0 km, unofficial)

Team Results

Men's

Women's (unofficial)

Participation

Men's
An unofficial count yields the participation of 89 male athletes from 10 countries.

 (9)
 (9)
 (9)
 (9)
 (9)
 (8)
 (9)
 (9)
 (9)
 (9)

Women's
An unofficial count yields the participation of 12 female athletes from 2 countries.

 (6)
 (6)

See also
 1957 in athletics (track and field)

References

International Cross Country Championships
International Cross Country Championships
Cross
International Cross Country Championships
Cross country running in Belgium
Cross country running in the United Kingdom